Denon Records was a Japanese audiophile record label owned by Denon and distributed by A&M Records from 1990 through 1992. This was a reissue program that included 390 jazz and classical music titles that were issued on compact disc.

Artists

Aerosmith
Alesso
András Adorján
Archie Shepp
Art Farmer
Bob Berg
Camerata Bern
Count Basie Orchestra
Czech Philharmonic
Dave Burrell
Eliane Elias
Hélène Grimaud
Huguette Dreyfus
Kenny Barron
Luis Conte
Michel Dalberto
Peter Erskine
Randy Brecker
Ryuichi Sakamoto
Sadao Watanabe
Steve Laury
Tommy Flanagan

References

Audiophile record labels
Classical music record labels
Denon Records albums
Japanese record labels
Jazz record labels